DamNation is a 2014 documentary directed by Ben Knight and Travis Rummel. It is an advocacy documentary film about the changing attitudes in the United States concerning the large system of dams in the country. 

The film was produced by Patagonia, Inc., and released on March 10, 2014.  Blu-ray and DVD versions were also released in 2014.

The film takes an explicit point of view in support of the emerging environmental strategy of dam removal as a way to restore river ecosystems.

Awards
 "Documentary Spotlight" (audience award) at South by Southwest (SXSW Film Festival), 2014 
 Winner, 2014 "Documentary Award for Environmental Advocacy," Environmental Film Festival in the Nation's Capital.

References

External links
 Full film, made freely public by Patagonia, April 2020.
 
 
 
 Review in The New York Times by Nicolas Rapold: https://www.nytimes.com/2014/05/09/movies/damnation-a-documentary-wants-nature-left-alone.html
 Interview with Stoecker and Knight: https://archive.today/20140711095510/http://www.wcsh6.com/video/3548225139001/49743021001/DamNation-Documentary

Documentary films about hydroelectricity
2014 films
2014 in the environment
2014 documentary films
American documentary films
Dam controversies
2010s English-language films
2010s American films